Barbara Freitag-Rouanet (born 26 November 1941, in Obernzell) is a German-born Brazilianist, sociologist, author, and academic at Universidade de Brasília. Her family emigrated to Brazil in 1948 when she was 7.

Graduated in Sociology, Psychology and Philosophy at the Universities of Frankfurt / M. and Berlin. Obtained her PhD at the Technical University of Berlin and pursued her Habilitation at the Free University of Berlin. Taught in these and other European universities. In Brazil, she worked at the University of Brasilia as a tenured professor and received the title of Professor Emeritus. Was also a visiting professor at USP, UNESP, UFPR, UFBa, among others. At UNESCO she occupied the chair entitled "City and Environment". She coordinated an integrated research project that studied the transfer of Brazilian capitals.

She was married to the Brazilian diplomat and writer Sérgio Paulo Rouanet and has a daughter, Adriana Rouanet, who is a cultural producer.

Published works
Books by Barbara Freitag include:
Die brasilianische Bildungspolitik: Resultante oder Agens gesellschaftl. Wandlungsprozesse? (Beitrage zur Soziologie und Sozialkunde Lateinamerikas) (German Edition) (1975) 
 Der Aufbau kindlicher Bewusstseinsstrukturen im gesellschaftlichen Kontext: Eine Untersuchung schulpflichtiger Kinder in Brasilien (Beitrage zur Soziologie ... Sozialkunde Lateinamerikas) (German Edition) (1983) 
 A Teoria Crítica: Ontem e Hoje (Portuguese Edition) (1984) 
 O livro didático em questão (Colecao Educação contemporânea) (Portuguese Edition) (1989) 
 Itinerarios de Antigona: A questão da moralidade (Portuguese Edition) (1992) 
 Dialogando com Jürgen Habermas (Portuguese Edition) (2005) 
 Teorias da Cidade (2006) 
 Capitais migrantes e Poderes peregrinos: O caso do Rio de Janeiro (Portuguese Edition) (2009)

References

Academic staff of the University of Brasília
Living people
German emigrants to Brazil
1941 births